The Syro-Malankara Catholic Eparchy of Puthur (or - Puttur) (also called Puthur of the Syro-Malankars), the first Syro-Malankara Catholic diocese in India's southern Karnataka, is a suffragan in the ecclesiastical province of the Metropolitan Syro-Malankara Catholic Archeparchy of Tiruvalla, which depends on the Major Archbishop of Trivandrum, the head of the Syro-Malankara Catholic Church (Antiochian Rite Eastern Catholic particular church in Syriac and Malayalam languages), and with it on the Roman Congregation for the Oriental Churches.

Its episcopal see is the St. Mary's Pro-Cathedral at Noojibalthila, in Kerala's Puttur taluk. Its headquarters are Catholic Bishop's House, Parladka, P.O. Puttur, 574203, Karnataka.

Statistics 
As per 2015, it pastorally served 2,800 Catholics in 25 parishes with 25 priests (17 diocesan, 8 religious), 33 lay religious (8 brothers, 25 sisters), 6 seminarians. The diocese has 22 churches under it spread across the civil districts of Dakshina Kannada, Udupi, Kodagu, Hassan, Chikmagalur, Mandya, Mysore, Shimoga and Chamarajanagar. There are 36 educational and 4 charitable institutions.

History 
It was established on 25 January 2010 as Eparchy (Diocese) of Puthur / Puttur / Latin adjective Puthuren(sis), on territory split off from the (northern parts of the) territory of the Syro-Malankara Catholic Eparchy of Bathery, whose Bishop Geevarghese Divannasios Ottathengil was appointed as its first ordinary. He later resigned on January 24, 2017 due to health problems.

Episcopal Ordinaries 
(all native Indians and Syro-Malankar Rite)

'' Suffragan Eparchs (Bishops) of Puthur
 Geevarghese Divannasios Ottathengil (2010.01.25 – retired 2017.01.24), died 2018; previously Eparch (Bishop) of mother see Bathery of the Syro-Malankars (India) (1996.11.11 – 2010.01.25)
 George Kalayil (2017.08.05 – ...)

See also 
 Roman Catholic Diocese of Mangalore
 Roman Catholic Diocese of Udupi
 Deanery of Belthangady
 Christianity in Karnataka
 Syro-Malabar Catholic Eparchy of Belthangady
 Most Holy Redeemer Church, Belthangady

References

Sources and External links 
 GCatholic, with Google HQ satellite pic
 forums.catholic.com 
 www.hindu.com
 www.muvattupuzhadiocese.com 

Puthur
Eastern Catholic dioceses in India
Christianity in Karnataka
Dioceses established in the 21st century
Christian organizations established in 2010
2010 establishments in Karnataka